National Chiayi University (NCYU) is a public university located in Chiayi City and Chiayi County, Taiwan. It was formed in 2000 by merging National Chiayi Institute of Technology and National Chiayi Teachers College. The University has six colleges, which include seven doctoral programs, 42 full-time master's degree programs, twelve part-time master's degree programs, and 38 undergraduate programs now. NCYU is one of the oldest and largest universities in southern Taiwan.

History
The history of the university can be traced back from the merger between two different schools.

Former KANO
The Kagi Agriculture and Forestry Public School (KANO) was established in April 1919 under Japanese rule and reorganized and renamed as Taiwan Provincial Chiayi Agri-Vocational School in November 1945. The school was then upgraded to become Taiwan Provincial Chiayi Junior College of Agriculture in March 1965. In July 1981, it became a national college and funded by the Ministry of Education. In July 1997, it was upgraded again to become National Chiayi Institute of Technology.

Former Normal school
The Taiwan Provincial Chiayi Normal School was founded in 1957. In August 1996, the school was upgraded to a five-year junior college and renamed Taiwan Provincial Chiayi Junior Teachers College. In July 1987, the college was reformed into a four-year college and renamed as Taiwan Provincial Chiayi Teachers College. In July 1987, the college was upgraded into a national college and renamed National Chiayi Teachers College.

University
In February 2000, National Chiayi Institute of Technology and National Chiayi Teachers College were merged and became National Chiayi University.

Campuses
NCYU comprises four campuses:

Lantan Main Campus

The campus is the administrative headquarters and located in the well-known scenic area between Lantan Reservoir and Renyitan Reservoir. It also accommodates the College of Agriculture, College of Science and Engineering and College of Life Sciences.

Address: 300 Syuefu Road, East District, Chiayi City

Minxiong Campus

This campus accommodates the Teachers College and College of Humanities and Arts.

Address: 85 Wunlong Village, Minxiong Township, Chiayi County

Linsen Campus

Extension and lifelong learning programs are offered in the campus to provide educational service to the local community.

Address: 151 Linsen East Road, East District, Chiayi City

Sinmin Campus

Sinmin Campus is situated in West District in downtown Chiayi. Sinmin accommodates College of Management and College of Veterinary medicine.

Address: 580 Sinmin Road, West District, Chiayi City

Academics
NCYU consists of seven colleges (Agriculture, Humanities and Arts, Life Sciences, Management, Science and Engineering, Teachers, and Veterinary Medicine), 36 departments and 11 independent institutes, with 500 full-time faculty professors.

Ranking

Notable alumni
 Chen Ming-wen, Magistrate of Chiayi County (2001-2009)
 Huang Min-hui, acting Chairperson of Kuomintang

See also
 List of universities in Taiwan

References

External links

Official website 

 
1919 establishments in Taiwan
Educational institutions established in 1919
Technical universities and colleges in Taiwan